The Cemetery of La Plata is one of the most important cemeteries in Buenos Aires Province, Argentina. It is located on the intersection of Avenue 31, 72 and diagonal 74 in Altos de San Lorenzo, La Plata. It was declared Cultural Heritage and Memorial of Buenos Aires Province.

It was established in 1886 and designed by Pedro Benoit, who was also responsible for the design of the city. Some of his most remarkable architectural features are its main entrance and its many family vaults, which include neoclassical, Neo-Gothic, Art Nouveau (in its variant of Catalan Art Nouveau), Art Deco and Egyptian revival styles. The main entrance is an impressive neo-classical portico with Doric columns. The Catholic chapel, in Romanesque revival style, was finished in 1950.

Its annex, the Jewish Cemetery, belongs to the Asociación Mutual Israelita Argentina in La Plata and is located on Avenue 72.

Bibliography

References

External links 

Cemeteries in Argentina
La Plata
1886 establishments in Argentina
Buildings and structures completed in 1886